The 1876 United States presidential election in North Carolina took place on November 7, 1876, as part of the 1876 United States presidential election. North Carolina voters chose 10 representatives, or electors, to the Electoral College, who voted for the president and vice president.

North Carolina was won by Samuel J. Tilden, the former governor of New York (D–New York), running with Thomas A. Hendricks, the governor of Indiana and future vice president, with 53.62% of the popular vote, against Rutherford B. Hayes, the governor of Ohio (R-Ohio), running with Representative William A. Wheeler, with 46.38% of the vote.

This is the only occasion when Unionist, high-altitude Mitchell County has ever voted for a Democratic Presidential candidate.

Results

Results by county

Notes

References 

North Carolina
1876
1876 North Carolina elections